Rekha Gupta is a leader of Bharatiya Janata Party from Delhi. She is a former general secretary and president of Delhi University Students Union, a member of national executive of the party and general secretary of Delhi state unit of the party.

She became the President of Delhi University Students' Union (DUSU) in the year 1996–1997.  She was elected to the Delhi Councillor elections from Uttari Pitampura (Ward 54) in 2007.She was again 
elected to Delhi Councillor elections from Uttari Pitampura (ward 54) in 2012.

References

Delhi politicians
Presidents of Delhi University Students Union
Women in Delhi politics
Living people
Bharatiya Janata Party politicians from Delhi
21st-century Indian women politicians
21st-century Indian politicians
Year of birth missing (living people)